Michel Attenoux (June 14, 1930 in Paris – April 24, 1988 in Laval) was a French jazz saxophonist.

Attenoux played piano in his youth, later learning soprano saxophone and playing locally. He founded his own ensemble in 1951, which played with Peanuts Holland in 1952 and in 1953 was offered the position of house band at a Parisian club called Metro Jazz. There he played with Sidney Bechet, Jimmy Archey, and others. Starting in 1955, he added alto saxophone to his repertory, and played with visiting American musicians in Paris over the next several decades; he also played at the Newport Jazz Festival in 1975. In the 1970s he worked with Geo Daly, Marc Laferrière, Al Grey, Eddie Lockjaw Davis, and the Lionel Hampton All-Stars. In 1978 he formed Les Petits Français with Moustache, Marcel Zanini, and François Guin, which recorded jazz versions of the songs of Georges Brassens.

Discography

With Al Grey
Grey's Mood (Black and Blue, 1973-75 [1979])

References
André Clergeat, "Michel Attenoux". The New Grove Dictionary of Jazz. 2nd edition, ed. Barry Kernfeld.

French jazz saxophonists
Male saxophonists
French jazz bandleaders
1930 births
1988 deaths
Musicians from Paris
20th-century saxophonists
20th-century French male musicians
French male jazz musicians